Luminița Gheorghiu (1 September 1949 – 4 July 2021) was a Romanian film actress, and artistic performer in East Central Europe. She achieved international recognition for her roles in The Death of Mr. Lazarescu (2006) and Child's Pose (2013). Gheorghiu's roles were mostly in Romanian and French, including that in Code Unknown with Juliette Binoche.

Gheorghiu was a 1972 graduate of the Institute of Theatrical and Cinematographic Arts in Bucharest, where she studied under professor Ion Cojar. She made her debut in 1971, at the Casandra Theatre, and then played at theaters in Botoșani and Piatra Neamț. From 1976 to 2003, she played at the Bulandra Theatre in Bucharest.

Gheorghiu died on 4 July 2021, at the age of 71.

Theatrical roles

Mărioara - Sânziana și Pepelea (Sanziana and Pepelea, a fairy story) by Vasile Alecsandri, directed by Alexandru Tocilescu, 1971, Studioul Casandra (Bucharest)
Mama Anghelușa -Cânticele comice (Comic Songs) by Vasile Alecsandri, directed by Ion Cojar, Studioul Casandra, 1971
Trandafira - Trei crai de la răsărit (The Three Magi) by Bogdan Petriceicu Hasdeu, directed by Ion Cojar, Studioul Casandra, 1971
Victorița - O fată imposibilă (An Impossible Girl) by Virgil Stoenescu, directed by Marietta Sadova, Teatrul "Mihai Eminescu" Botoșani, 1972
Vivian - Mrs. Warren's Profession by George Bernard Shaw, directed by Marietta Sadova, Teatrul "Mihai Eminescu" Botoșani, 1972
Mama - The Misunderstanding by Albert Camus, directed by Adrian Lupu, Studioul Casandra, 1972
Cristina - Ultima cursă (Last Race) by Horia Lovinescu, directed by Emil Mandric, Teatrul "Mihai Eminescu" Botoșani 1974
Lizzie Curry - The Rainmaker by N. Richard Nash, directed by Emil Mandric, Teatrul "Mihai Eminescu" Botoșani, 1974
Ciocârlia - Tinerețe fără bătrânețe și viață fără de moarte (Youth Without Age and Life Without Death) by Eduard Covali, directed by Cătălina Buzoianu, Teatrul Tineretului Piatra Neamț, 1975
Gerda - The Pelican by August Strindberg, directed by Ioan Taub, Teatrul Bulandra, 1976
Nimi - Miles Gloriosus by Plautus, directed by Anton Taub, Teatrul Bulandra, 1976
Safta - Răceala (The Cold) by Marin Sorescu, directed by Dan Micu, Teatrul Bulandra, 1977
Doctorița - Undeva, o lumină (Somewhere, a Light) by Doru Moțoc, directed by Valeriu Moisescu, Teatrul Bulandra, 1977
Lucietta - The New House by Carlo Goldoni, directed by Valeriu Moisescu, Teatrul Bulandra, 1978
La lilieci (By the Lilacs) by Marin Sorescu, directed by Virgil Ogășanu, Teatrul Bulandra, 1978
Șura - A Day of Rest by Valentin Katayev, directed by Valeriu Moisescu, Teatrul Bulandra, 1981
Dorina - Tartuffe by Molière, directed by Alexandru Tocilescu, Teatrul Bulandra, 1982
O actriță - A Cabal of Hypocrites by Mihail Bulgakov, directed by Alexandru Tocilescu, Teatrul Bulandra, 1982
Liniște, ne privim în ochi (Quietly, They Won't See Us) by Marin Sorescu, directed by Virgil Ogășanu, Teatrul Bulandra, 1983
O lume pe scenă (A World on Stage), directed by Miriam Răducanu, Teatrul Bulandra, 1984
Ea - The Bench by Alexander Gelman, directed by Mircea Cornișteanu, Teatrul Bulandra, 1984
Sonia - Uncle Vanya by Anton Chekhov, directed by Alexa Visarion, Teatrul Bulandra, 1985
Piticul Quaqueo - The Giants of the Mountain by Luigi Pirandello, directed by Cătălina Buzoianu, Teatrul Bulandra, 1987
Fira - Omul cu mârțoaga (The Man With the Jade) by Gheorghe Ciprian, directed by Petre Popescu, Teatrul Bulandra, 1989
Madame Bergman - The Awakening of Spring by Frank Wedekind, directed by Liviu Ciulei, Teatrul Bulandra, 1991
Vittoria - Comic Theater by Carlo Goldoni, directed by Silviu Purcărete, Teatrul Bulandra, 1992
Whore, Angel - The Seventh Commandment by Dario Fo, directed by Gelu Colceag, Teatrul Bulandra, 1993
A woman, wife of Ill - The Visit of the Old Lady by Friedrich Dürrenmatt, directed by Felix Alexa, Teatrul Bulandra, 1993
Paulina - The Winter's Tale by William Shakespeare, directed by Alexandru Darie, Teatrul Bulandra, 1994
Olga - Three Sisters by Anton Chekhov, directed by Alexandru Darie, Teatrul Bulandra, 1995
Prezicătoare - Julius Caesar by William Shakespeare, directed by Alexandru Darie, Teatrul Bulandra, 1995
Nevasta lui Simon - 1794, after Camil Petrescu, Georg Buchner, Peter Weiss; director and scenarist Alexandru Darie, Teatrul Bulandra, 1997
Exercises in Style, after Raymond Queneau, directed by Ileana Cârstea-Simion, Teatrul Bulandra, 1997
Bătrâna - Chickenhead by George Spiro, directed by Gelu Colceag, Teatrul Bulandra 1998
Eugenia - Tango by Slawomir Mrozek, directed by Gelu Colceag, Teatrul Bulandra, 2001
Portăreasa - De Pretore Vincenzo by Eduardo De Filippo, directed by Horațiu Mălăele, Teatrul Bulandra, 2003

Feature films
Labirintul (The Labyrinth, 1980), directed by Șerban Creangă
Secvențe, directed by Alexandru Tatos
Moromeții (The Moromete Family, 1987), directed by Stere Gulea - Catrina Moromete
Drumul câinilor (lit. Road of the Dogs, 1991), directed by Laurențiu Damian  
Rămânerea, directed by Laurențiu Damian  
Privește înainte cu mânie (Look Ahead with Anger, 1993), directed by Nicolae Mărgineanu - Lucreția Ciugudean
Prea târziu (Too Late, 1996), directed by Lucian Pintilie - Mureșan's wife
Trenul Vieții (Train of Life, 1998) - Rivka
Code inconnu: Récit incomplet de divers voyages (Code Unknown: Incomplete Tales of Several Journeys, 2000), directed by Michael Haneke
Marfa și banii (Stuff and Dough, 2001) - Ovidiu's mother
Moartea Domnului Lazarescu (Death of Mr. Lazarescu, 2005) - Mioara Avram
4 luni, 3 săptămâni și 2 zile (2007) - Gina 
Vine poliția! (Here comes the police) (TV Series) (2008) - Lucreția Corbescu
Nunta mută (Silent Wedding) (2008) - Fira
Regina (The Queen) (TV Series) (2009) - Elvira 
Iubire și onoare (Love and Honor) (TV Series) (2010) - Dr. Mioara Avram
Aurora (2010) - Mioara Avram
Pariu cu viața (TV Series) (2011 - 2013) - Minerva Dumitrescu
Brave (2012) - The Witch (dubbing)
Dupa dealuri (Beyond the Hills, 2012), directed by Cristian Mungiu
Child's Pose (2013) - won the international award Golden Bear at Berlin International Film Festival - Cornelia Keneres
Aferim! (2015) - Smaranda Cîndescu
Deschide ochii (Open your eyes) (TV Series) (2016) - Zina Barbu
Fructul oprit (TV Series) (2018) - Reveca Boască
Sacrificiul (TV Series) (2019) - Safta

References

External links

1949 births
2021 deaths
Romanian stage actresses
Romanian film actresses
Actresses from Bucharest
20th-century Romanian actresses
21st-century Romanian actresses
Caragiale National University of Theatre and Film alumni